Guy Leverne Fake (November 15, 1879 – September 23, 1957) was a United States district judge of the United States District Court for the District of New Jersey.

Education and career

Born in Cobleskill, New York, Fake lived in Rutherford, New Jersey from the age of one. He served in the United States Army during the Spanish–American War in 1898. He received a Bachelor of Laws from New York University School of Law in 1904, and held a private practice in Rutherford from 1904 to 1907. He was a member of the New Jersey General Assembly from 1907 to 1908, and a district court judge of the Second Judicial District of Bergen County, New Jersey from 1909 to 1924. He was a New Jersey Supreme Court Commissioner in 1926.

Federal judicial service

On February 4, 1929, Fake was nominated by President Calvin Coolidge to a seat on the United States District Court for the District of New Jersey vacated by Judge James William McCarthy. Fake was confirmed by the United States Senate on February 12, 1929, and received his commission the same day. He served as Chief Judge from 1948 to 1951, and assumed senior status on February 21, 1951. He served in that capacity until his death of a heart attack on September 23, 1957, in his home in Rutherford.

References

Sources
 
 Guy Laverne [sic] Fake at The Historical Society of the US District Court
 Guy Leverne Fake entry at The Political Graveyard

1879 births
1957 deaths
American military personnel of the Spanish–American War
Judges of the United States District Court for the District of New Jersey
Members of the New Jersey General Assembly
New Jersey lawyers
New York University School of Law alumni
Politicians from Bergen County, New Jersey
United States district court judges appointed by Calvin Coolidge
20th-century American judges
United States Army soldiers
People from Cobleskill, New York
People from Rutherford, New Jersey